Colin Philp Jr. (24 October 1964 – 25 December 2021) was a Fijian sailor. He competed in the Finn event at the 1988 Summer Olympics. His father, Colin Philp Sr., also competed in the Olympics. He died from liver failure in Australia on 25 December 2021, at the age of 57.

References

External links

1964 births
2021 deaths
Fijian male sailors (sport)
Olympic sailors of Fiji
Sailors at the 1988 Summer Olympics – Finn
Sportspeople from Suva
Deaths from kidney failure
20th-century Fijian people
21st-century Fijian people